James Reilly may refer to:
James Bernard Reilly (1845–1924), U.S. Representative from Pennsylvania
James E. Reilly (1948–2008), American television script writer
James F. Reilly (born 1954), American astronaut and geologist, director of the U.S. Geological Survey
James W. Reilly (1828–1905), American Civil War general in the Union Army and Ohio state representative
James Reilly (Canadian politician) (1835–1909), Canadian businessman and Mayor of Calgary
James Reilly (Irish politician) (born 1955), Irish Fine Gael politician
James Reilly (swimmer) (1890–1962), American swimmer
James Marshall Reilly (born 1981), American entrepreneur, author and public speaker
Jim Reilly (born 1957), drummer for punk band Stiff Little Fingers
Jim Reilly (Gaelic footballer) (1924–2013), Irish footballer
Jim Reilly (Illinois politician) (1945–2022), American politician from Illinois
Joe Reilly (baseball) (James Reilly, 1861–?), American baseball player

See also
James Riley (disambiguation)
James O'Reilly (disambiguation)